Uyghur Americans are Americans of Uyghur ethnicity. Most Uyghurs immigrated from Xinjiang, China, to the United States from the late 1980s onwards, with a significant number arriving after July 2009.

History
Uyghurs' history in the United States dates back to the 1960s with the arrival of a small number of immigrants. In the late 20th century, after a series of Xinjiang conflicts, more millions of Uyghurs fled from Xinjiang to Kazakhstan, Turkey, Europe, Canada, Australia, New Zealand, and other countries and places. 

A 2010 estimate put the Uyghur population in the United States at more than 8,000, however, the Uyghur American Association has said that more have moved to the United States in the 2010s because of the crackdown of July 2009 Ürümqi riots in China in July 2009. As of 2022, the Uyghur American Association estimates there are about 10,000 Uyghurs in the United States while the East Turkistan Government in Exile estimates there are between 10,000 and 15,000 Uyghurs in the United States.

Several thousand Uyghurs are said to be living in the Washington, D.C. area, which has the largest population of Uyghurs in the United States. There are also small populations of Uyghurs in Los Angeles, New York, San Francisco and Houston.

In 2019, the Chinese government was reported to have harassed and abused Uyghurs in the United States, in an attempt to control the speech and actions of Uyghur-Americans. Section 8 of the Uyghur Human Rights Policy Act of 2020 requires a report on "efforts to protect United States citizens and residents, including ethnic Uyghurs and Chinese nationals legally studying or working temporarily in the United States, who have experienced harassment or intimidation within the United States by officials or agents of the Government of the People’s Republic of China" to be produced within 90 days.

Organizations
As with other ethnic groups in the United States, Uyghur Americans also have several organizations. The most well-known organizations are:

 the Uyghur American Association, a Washington D.C. based advocacy organization which was established in 1998 by a group of Uyghur overseas activists to raise the public awareness of the Uyghur people
 the East Turkistan National Awakening Movement, a youth led organization which was set up by Uyghur graduate student Salih Hudayar in 2017 
 the East Turkistan Government in Exile, which was set up by Uyghur activist Anwar Yusuf Turani in 2004.

Notable people

Rushan Abbas, activist and vice president of the Uyghur American Association
Gulchehra Hoja, journalist with Radio Free Asia
Shohret Hoshur, journalist with Radio Free Asia
Salih Hudayar, current Prime Minister of the East Turkistan Government-in-Exile
Elnigar Iltebir, Director for China at the United States National Security Council
Rebiya Kadeer, former President of the World Uyghur Congress (resident in the US)
Gulimina Mahamuti, pianist  
Shoukhrat Mitalipov, stem cell researcher
Maya Mitalipova, work at Whitehead Institute for Biomedical Research at MIT
Anwar Yusuf Turani, political activist
Nury Turkel, commissioner on the United States Commission on International Religious Freedom 
Mihrigul Tursun, former detainee in the Xinjiang re-education camps

See also
Uyghur American Association
The Uyghur Human Rights Project
East Turkistan National Awakening Movement
East Turkistan Government-in-Exile
List of Uyghurs

References

 
Central Asian American
Uyghur diaspora